Marsa Football Club are a Maltese football club from the harbour town of Marsa, which currently plays in the Maltese Challenge League.

The team played at the UEFA Cup during the 1971–72 season and has played several seasons in the Maltese top division.

References

External links

 
Football clubs in Malta
1920 establishments in Malta
Association football clubs established in 1920